Edayappuram is a small village in Aluva Taluk, Ernakulam district in the Indian state of Kerala and located at a distance of 3 km from Aluva town and 16 km from Perumbavoor.

Transportation
Kerala State Road Transport Corporation (KSRTC) and some of the private buses operates regular services through this area.

Geography
Edayappuram is surrounded by green foliage and paddy fields. Fertile land of Edayappuram is suitable for all crops include rice, rubber, and coconut. Proximity of Periyar River, the lifeline of Kerala makes this land fertile.

Demographics
At the 2001 census, Edayappuram had a population of 28,607. The majority of people living in Edayappuram are Muslim and Hindus although there is also a Christian minority population living there too.

References

Villages in Ernakulam district